The following highways are numbered 583:

United States